Liang Kentang (梁肯堂,1717-1801) was a Chinese official during the Qing Dynasty.

Liang was born in Hangzhou, Zhejiang province. In 1756, he succeeded in the provincial exam and obtained the Juren title. 

He was nominated Viceroy of Zhili in 1790. On 6 August, 1793, he met Macartney and Staunton of the British Macartney Embassy during the British diplomatic mission in China.

References
清史列传(Biographies of the Qing Period)

1717 births
1801 deaths
Politicians from Hangzhou
Qing dynasty governors of Shanxi
Viceroys of Zhili
Qing dynasty politicians from Zhejiang